Johanna Teague is a Swedish Diplomat who currently serves as Swedish Ambassador in Rwanda with residency in Kigali since  August 2020. Before her appointment she served as Group Manager at the Swedish Ministry for Foreign Affairs' International Development Cooperation Agency. Previously she had served as an Advisor to the Minister for Development at Sida in Stockholm and Bolivia, as well as for the UN's Populations Fund in La Paz (UNFPA) 

She is the second Swedish ambassador in Rwanda after opening of the embassy and replaced Jenny Ohlsson in August 2020.

References 

Ambassadors of Sweden to Rwanda
Living people
Year of birth missing (living people)